The babbling starling (Neocichla gutturalis) is a species of starling in the family Sturnidae. It is monotypic within the genus Neocichla. It is found in the African countries of Angola, Malawi, Tanzania, and Zambia.

References

External links
Image at ADW 

babbling starling
babbling starling
Birds of Southern Africa
babbling starling
Taxonomy articles created by Polbot